Urodinychus is a genus of mites in the family Urodinychidae.

Species
 Urodinychus carinata (Berlese, 1888)

References

Mesostigmata
Acari genera